Kay Thompson (born Catherine Louise Fink; November 9, 1909 – July 2, 1998) was an American author, singer, vocal arranger, vocal coach, composer, musician, dancer, actress, and choreographer. She became famous for creating the Eloise children's books and for her role in the movie Funny Face.

Early life and family
Thompson was born Catherine Louise Fink in St. Louis, Missouri, in 1909, the second of the four children of Leo George Fink, a Jewish, Austrian-born pawnbroker and jeweler, and his American born wife, Harriet Adelaide "Hattie" Tetrick, a Christian. Thompson's parents were married on November 29, 1905, in East St. Louis, St. Clair County, Illinois.

Thompson's siblings were: Blanche Margaret Hurd, George "Bud" Fink, Jr. and Marian Antoinette Doenges.

Radio work
Thompson began her career in the 1930s as a singer and choral director for radio. Her first big break was as a regular singer on the Bing Crosby-Woodbury Show Bing Crosby Entertains (CBS, 1933–34). This led to a regular spot on The Fred Waring-Ford Dealers Show (NBC, 1934–35) and then, with conductor Lennie Hayton, she co-founded The Lucky Strike Hit Parade (CBS, 1935) where she met (and later married) trombonist Jack Jenney. Thompson and Her Rhythm Singers joined André Kostelanetz and His Orchestra for the hit series The Chesterfield Radio Program (CBS, 1936), followed by It's Chesterfield Time (CBS, 1937) for which Thompson and her large choir were teamed with Hal Kemp and His Orchestra.

For her motion picture debut, Thompson and her choir performed two songs in the Republic Pictures musical Manhattan Merry-Go-Round (1937). In 1939, she reunited with André Kostelanetz for Tune-Up Time (CBS), a show that was produced by radio legend William Spier (who later married Thompson in 1942). On an installment of Tune-Up Time in April 1939, 16-year-old Judy Garland was a guest. It was at this time that Thompson first met and worked with Garland, developing a close personal friendship and professional association that lasted the rest of Garland's life.

Hollywood

In 1943, Thompson signed an exclusive contract with MGM to become the studio's top vocal arranger, vocal coach, and choral director. She served as main vocal arranger for many of producer Arthur Freed's MGM musicals and as vocal coach to such stars as Judy Garland, Lena Horne, Frank Sinatra, and June Allyson. Some of the many MGM musicals Thompson was the vocal arranger for include Ziegfeld Follies (1945), The Harvey Girls (1946), Till the Clouds Roll By (1946), Good News (1947), and The Pirate (1948).

As a film actress, Thompson only played one major role: that of fashion editor Maggie Prescott in the musical Funny Face (1957) for Paramount Pictures. Reunited with producer and songwriter Roger Edens and director Stanley Donen, her colleagues from MGM, Thompson garnered critical praise for her stylish turn as an editor based on real-life Harper's Bazaar editor Diana Vreeland, opening the film with her splashy "Think Pink!" and performing duets with Astaire and Hepburn.

In a December 6, 2006, interview on Turner Classic Movies, Donen said that Funny Face was made at Paramount with a primarily MGM crew, including Donen, Edens and Thompson, because Paramount Pictures would not release Hepburn for any film except one made at Paramount. Thompson only acted in one additional feature film, 1970's Tell Me That You Love Me, Junie Moon, because, according to its star Liza Minnelli, Thompson disliked the slow speed of movie production.

Night Club
Thompson left MGM in 1947 after working on The Pirate to create the night club act "Kay Thompson and the Williams Brothers", with the four Williams men as her backup singers and dancers. They made their debut in Las Vegas in 1947 and became an overnight sensation. Within a year, they were the highest paid nightclub act in the world, breaking records wherever they appeared. She wrote the songs and Robert Alton did the original choreography for the act.

Eloise

Thompson, who lived at the Plaza Hotel in New York City, became most notable as the author of the Eloise series of children's books. The Eloise character was developed by the author based on her childhood imaginary friend and alter ego, with a voice in which Thompson spoke throughout her life, according to her biographer, filmmaker Sam Irvin. Thompson's goddaughter, Liza Minnelli, was often speculated as a possible model for Eloise.

The four books in the series, each illustrated by Hilary Knight, are Eloise (Simon & Schuster, 1955), Eloise in Paris (Simon & Schuster, 1957), Eloise at Christmastime (Random House, 1958) and Eloise in Moscow (Simon & Schuster, 1959). They follow the adventures of a precocious six-year-old girl who lives at The Plaza. All were bestsellers upon release and have been adapted into television projects. Thompson composed and performed a Top 40 hit song, "Eloise" (Cadence Records, 1956).

A fifth book, Eloise Takes a Bawth, was posthumously published by Simon & Schuster in 2002, culled from Thompson's original manuscripts once slated for 1964 publication by Harper & Row. However, in 1964 Thompson was burned out on Eloise; she blocked publication and took all but the first book out of print.

Recordings
As a singer, Thompson made very few records, starting with one side, "Take a Number from One to Ten", on a 1934 session by the Tom Coakley band. In 1935, she recorded four sides for Brunswick ("You Hit The Spot", "You Let Me Down," "Don't Mention Love To Me," and "Out of Sight, Out of Mind"), and another four sides for Victor.  The 4 Brunswick sides are excellent examples of mid-1930s sophisticated New York cabaret singing. She later recorded for Capitol, Columbia, Decca, and, most importantly, for MGM Records, which issued her only complete album of songs, in 1954. In February 1956, Thompson wrote and recorded the song "Eloise" at Cadence Records with an orchestra conducted by Archie Bleyer. The song debuted on March 10, 1956, and became a Top 40 hit, selling over 100,000 copies.

Throughout the 1950s and early 1960s, Thompson mentored the solo career of the young Andy Williams. She helped land him a regular singing spot on NBC-TV's new late-night series, The Tonight Show, hosted by Steve Allen. She got her friend Archie Bleyer to add Williams to the roster of artists on his label Cadence Records where she wrote many of the songs he recorded, including the 1958 Top 20 hit "Promise Me, Love". In 1963, Thompson paired the Christmas song "Holiday Season"—a song she had written and first performed in 1945—with the 1942 Irving Berlin Christmas song Happy Holiday, and gave it to Williams to sing. This medley arrangement and recording became a very popular hit, and has since been covered by many artists. Although it had been denied for decades, Williams admitted in his 2009 memoir, Moon River and Me (Viking Press), that he and Thompson had been secret lovers for several years, despite the age gap between them.

Thompson later recorded a spoken-word album for Signature Records, Let's Talk About Russia, which detailed her adventures in Moscow. Signature released a single of two songs by Thompson, "Dasvidanya" and "Moscow Cha Cha". She served as an adviser to Patti Page's 1957 television series, The Big Record. 

Thompson kept busy with nightclub and television performances, as well as overseeing her successful "Eloise" franchise. She returned to live in New York in 1969. Immediately following the death of Judy Garland in 1969, Thompson appeared with goddaughter Liza Minnelli in Tell Me That You Love Me, Junie Moon (1970). In 1974, Thompson directed a fashion show at the Palace of Versailles, featuring a performance by Minnelli and the collections of Halston, Bill Blass, Oscar de la Renta, and Anne Klein.

Death
Thompson eventually moved into Minnelli's Upper East Side penthouse. On July 2, 1998, she was found unconscious in bed and rushed to Lenox Hill Hospital, where she was officially pronounced dead, aged 88.

Personal life
Thompson was married twice:
 Jack Jenney, trombonist and bandleader, married 1937, divorced 1939 
 William Spier, radio producer, married 1942, divorced 1947 

After her second marriage failed, Thompson began a secret affair with Andy Williams (who was half her age) from 1947 to 1961. In December 1961 Williams married Claudine Longet.  Thompson moved to Rome and never remarried.

Legacy
The original soundtrack to Funny Face has been remastered and reissued as an expanded 60th anniversary edition, with eight alternate tracks, including four featuring Thompson. Most of her work for MGM has been preserved and released on Rhino/Turner Classic Movies original soundtrack series, including little-known contributions she did for films such as Meet the People (1944) and Abbott and Costello in Hollywood (1945). Her 1930s recordings are available on the CD "Kay Thompson: Queen of Swing Vocal & Her Rhythm Singers" (Baldwin Street Records), produced and annotated by Ted Ono. The rest of her recording career is compiled on the 3-CD box set "Think Pink! A Kay Thompson Party" (Sepia Records), produced and annotated by Thompson biographer Sam Irvin.
 In 2003 Thompson was posthumously inducted into the St. Louis Walk of Fame.
 Minnelli recreated Thompson's nightclub act for her 2009 Tony Award-winning Broadway event, Liza's at the Palace. A CD cast recording, a PBS television special, and a DVD followed. Liza's at the Palace opened at New York's Palace theater, an affectionate salute to Thompson, her godmother. Supported by a quartet of singer-dancers standing in for the original Williams Brothers, Minnelli performed songs (with the original vocal arrangements) from Thompson's act, including "Clap Yo' Hands" and "Hello, Hello".
 There is an exhaustively-researched list of all of Thompson's hundreds of credits for radio, TV, movies, stage, books, and music at the "Kayographies" tab at Kay Thompson Website. Featuring over 300 pages of endnotes, sidebars, letters, credits, etc., the website includes exclusive comprehensive extras about Thompson, which, due to space considerations, could not be included in Kay Thompson: From Funny Face to Eloise by Sam Irvin (published by Simon & Schuster).
 Thompson's sister Blanche Hurd was designated as her literary heir and was the commanding interest in the Eloise franchise beginning in 1998. After Hurd's death in 2002, the estate passed to Hurd's two children, Julie Hurd Szende and John Hurd.

Filmography
 I Dood It (night club patron) (uncredited) (1943)
 Lost in a Harem (singer) (uncredited) (1944)
 Broadway Rhythm (vocal arranger) (1944) 
 Two Girls and a Sailor  (Vocal Arranger) (1944)
 Meet the People (Vocal Arranger) (1944)
 Meet Me in St. Louis (Vocal Arranger) (uncredited) (1944)
 Weekend at the Waldorf (Choral Arrangements)
 Thrill of a Romance (Hotel Guest) (Uncredited)
 Till the Clouds Roll By (vocal arranger/audience member) (uncredited) (1946)
 No Leave, No Love (vocal arranger/glamorous woman) (uncredited) (1946)
 The Kid from Brooklyn (1946)
 The Harvey Girls  (as Vocal Arranger) (1946)
 Ziegfeld Follies (Writer: A Great Lady Has an Interview) (1945)
 Good News ( Matron/Vocal Arranger) (1947)
 The Pirate  (as Vocal Arranger) (1948)
 Lady Possessed (As Nurse) (1952)
 Funny Face (1957) (as Maggie Prescot)
 Tell Me That You Love Me, Junie Moon (1970) (as Gregory)

References

External links

 
 
 Kay Thompson at St. Louis Walk of Fame
 

1909 births
1998 deaths
Actresses from St. Louis
American children's writers
American women composers
American film actresses
American stage actresses
Jewish American actresses
Jewish American writers
Jewish American artists
Jewish women artists
Writers from St. Louis
Writers from New York City
Apex Records artists
Musicians from St. Louis
Cadence Records artists
20th-century American actresses
20th-century American singers
20th-century American composers
20th-century American women singers
20th-century women composers